Cony may refer to:

 Cony (surname)
 Cony High School, a public school located in Augusta, Maine, United States
 Cony 360, a kei car, truck and van made by Aichi Kokuki
 , a destroyer which served in World War II
 Cony Lake, Idaho, United States

See also
 Coney (disambiguation)
 CNY (disambiguation)
 Kony (disambiguation)